Douglas Arthur Shedden (born April 29, 1961) is a Canadian ice hockey coach and former player. He played in the National Hockey League between 1981 and 1991. After his playing career he became a coach, and worked in the minor leagues for several years. He coached Team Finland to a bronze medal in 2008 World Championships. Shedden is currently coaching ERC Ingolstadt in the German DEL.

Playing career
As a youth, Shedden played in the 1974 Quebec International Pee-Wee Hockey Tournament with a minor ice hockey team from Barrie.

Shedden, who played the position of centre, spent eight seasons playing in the National Hockey League for the Pittsburgh Penguins, Detroit Red Wings, Quebec Nordiques and Toronto Maple Leafs. He was drafted 93rd overall by the Penguins in the 1980 NHL Entry Draft. In 416 career NHL games, Shedden recorded 139 goals and 186 assists for 325 points. Shedden had a brief stint in Europe as he played in Italy for two seasons but returned to North America and retired from playing in 1993.

Coaching career
Shedden's Career as head coach started when he was hired to take over the Wichita Thunder in 1992. After leading Wichita to back-to-back CHL Championships in 1993-94 and 1994–95, Shedden coached several teams in UHL, CHL and ECHL before becoming the head coach for St. John's Maple Leafs of the AHL, where he guided the team to their best record for wins in franchise history in their final year in St. John's.

After that Shedden was hired by Finnish SM-liiga team HIFK to replace Dave King, who had decided to go to Metallurg Magnitogorsk of the Russian Superleague instead of HIFK. Shedden's single season at the helm of HIFK was good and the team fought its way to the bronze medal game. HIFK however lost to HPK.

After his debut in the SM-liiga, Shedden was acquired by HIFK's local rivals Jokerit, where Shedden made an impact during his first season as the head coach of the team.  Jokerit survived all the way to the Finals but were defeated by Kärpät. Shedden's second season as the head coach of Jokerit was a bit of a disappointment. Jokerit did advance to the playoffs, but were defeated four games to three by Espoo Blues in the Semifinals even though Jokerit had a 3–1 lead in the best-of-seven series.

The 2007–08 Season with Jokerit was Shedden's last, as he was contracted by EV Zug, a Swiss professional ice hockey team playing in the Swiss Nationalliga A (NLA). He spent six years at the Zug helm and coached EVZ to five playoff semifinal appearances. When Zug finished the 2013-14 regular season in 10th place and missed the playoffs, Shedden was relieved of his duties.

In October 2014, Shedden took over the reins at Medveščak Zagreb of the Kontinental Hockey League (KHL) and parted ways with the team at the end of the 2014–15 season. He returned to Switzerland, accepting the head coaching job at NLA side HC Lugano in October 2015. He coached the team to an appearance in the NLA finals in his first year, where they were defeated by SC Bern. In 2015 and 2016, he led HCL to the Spengler Cup final, where they fell short to Team Canada twice. On January 16, 2017, Shedden was fired by HC Lugano.

He was appointed as ERC Ingolstadt head coach on December 22, 2017, signing a deal for the remainder of the 2017–18 season with the German DEL team.

National team coaching 
During his time at Jokerit, Shedden was also contracted by the Finnish National Team as head coach to replace Erkka Westerlund. Under Shedden's coaching, Finland won the bronze medal in the 2008 World Championships. Shedden's one-year contract ended after 2008 World Championships and he was replaced by his assistant coach, Jukka Jalonen.

He served as assistant coach of Team Canada at the 2009, 2010 and 2011 Spengler Cup. In 2012 and 2013, he was named head coach, guiding Canada to victory in the prestigious tournament in 2012.

Shedden was also a member of Canada's coaching staff at the 2013 IIHF World Championships.

Career statistics

Regular season and playoffs

Coaching statistics

References

External links
 

1961 births
Living people
Canadian expatriate ice hockey players in Switzerland
Canadian ice hockey centres
Canadian ice hockey coaches
Detroit Red Wings players
ECHL coaches
Finland men's national ice hockey team coaches
Hamilton Fincups players
HC Davos players
Ice hockey people from Ontario
Kitchener Rangers players
Pittsburgh Penguins players
Pittsburgh Penguins draft picks
Quebec Nordiques players
St. John's Maple Leafs coaches
Sault Ste. Marie Greyhounds players
Sportspeople from Chatham-Kent
Toronto Maple Leafs players
United Hockey League coaches
Wichita Thunder coaches